Havbro is a village in western Himmerland with a population of 378 (1 January 2022), located 7 km northeast of Farsø and 6 km west of Aars. The city belongs to the Vesthimmerland and is located in North Jutland.
Havbro belong to Havbro Sogn and Havbro Church is located in the city. In the late 1800s Havbro had a hall which was built in 1885, bakery and nursery. Havbro had a station on Aalborg Hvalpsund rail and it was used from 1910 to 1969. The station is on Elevvej 15. The old train track is made into path you can run or go on.

School
Havbro Village School - Himmerlands Free School has 121 students at 0.-ninth grade, divided into 8 classes, of which 4 are read together in two steps. Free School also SFO robber cave with an activity and day care for pupils in 0th-fourth class. Sneglehuset(English: snailhouse) with kindergarten and nursery merged with the Free School 1 January 2015. [2]

Himmerlands Youth School is a boarding school, which was founded in 1920 and offers lessons in the 8th, 9th and 10th grade. The school has 19 employees and space for 120 students.

References

External links
 Vesthimmerland municipality's official website 
 Municipal statistics: NetBorger Kommunefakta, delivered from KMD aka Kommunedata (Municipal Data)

Vesthimmerland Municipality
Towns and settlements in Vesthimmerland Municipality